Decennier is a studio album by Swedish singer Björn Skifs, released on 7 December 2005. It consists of recordings of old songs.

Track listing
Underbart är kort
En stilla flirt
Med dig i mina armar
Utan dej
Nu tändas åter ljusen i min lilla stad
Havet, vinden och stjärnorna
En månskenspromenad
Följ mej bortåt vägen
Regntunga skyar
Den dagen visorna dör
Till dig
Nattens melodi

Contributors
Björn Skifs - vocals
Peter Milefors - drums
Bosse Persson - doubblebass
Magnus Bengtsson - guitar
Tina Ahlin - harmonica
Hans Gardemar - grand piano, keyboard, accordion, percussion
Bengt Palmers - producer
Stockholm Session Strings - musicians

Charts

References 

2005 albums
Björn Skifs albums
Swedish-language albums